The ADI Sportster is a two-seat gyroplane that has been marketed in plans form for homebuilding since 1974 by Aircraft Designs Inc. It was the first homebuilt gyrocopter design to be able to carry a passenger.

The design first flew in 1974 and is built from bolted and riveted dural aluminium sheet. The rotor blades use an NACA 8H12 airfoil

Specifications

References

Homebuilt aircraft
1970s United States sport aircraft
Single-engined pusher autogyros
Sportster
Aircraft first flown in 1974